Ken Billington (born October 29, 1946) is an American lighting designer.  He began his career in New York City working as an assistant to Tharon Musser.

He was born in White Plains, New York, the son of Kenneth Arthur (an automobile dealer) and Ruth (Roane) Billington.

Billington has 96 Broadway productions to his credit including Copperfield, Checking Out, Moon Over Buffalo, Grind, Hello, Dolly!, Meet Me in St. Louis, On the Twentieth Century, Side by Side by Sondheim, Lettice and Lovage, Tru, The Scottsboro Boys, and Sweeney Todd.

Off-Broadway productions include Sylvia, London Suite, Annie Warbucks, Lips Together, Teeth Apart, The Lisbon Traviata, What the Butler Saw, and Fortune and Men's Eyes.

Billington was the principal lighting designer for Radio City Music Hall from 1979 to 2004, where he created the lighting for the world-famous Christmas and Easter Spectaculars. While there, he also created the lighting for the stage adaptation of the 1937 animated musical film Snow White and the Seven Dwarfs. Other projects include lighting the 1975/76 season for the American Shakespeare Festival at Stratford, Connecticut as well as projects such as Turandot at the Vienna State Opera, to nightclub acts for headliners Ann-Margret, Shirley MacLaine, and Liberace.

At Disneyland, Billington's lighting is featured in the extravaganza Fantasmic. His architectural designs can be seen in restaurants and clubs from Manhattan to Asia. Ken also designed the lighting plot and original design for all four current Dolly Parton Dixie Stampede locations.

Billington has been nominated for the Tony Award for Best Lighting Design nine times and in 1997 won for the revival of Chicago, which also garnered him the Drama Desk Award for Outstanding Lighting Design.

In November 2015, Billington was inducted into the Theater Hall of Fame.

Awards and nominations

References

External links 

Biography American Theatre Wing
The Lighting Archive complete lighting paperwork for Sweeney Todd

American lighting designers
Tony Award winners
1946 births
Living people